Bayer 04 Leverkusen played the UEFA Champions League after finishing in 3rd place in the Bundesliga in 2003-04 and advanced to the Round of 16 in a tough group with Real Madrid, AS Roma and Dynamo Kyiv. The best results were a 5-1 win against Bayern Munich in the Bundesliga and a 3-0 win against Real Madrid in the Champions League. Dimitar Berbatov was the season top scorer with 26 goals.

Transfers

In

Out

Players

First-team squad
Squad at end of season

Left club during season

Results

Bundesliga

Champions League

Statistics

Top goalscorers

References

Notes

Bayer 04 Leverkusen seasons
Bayer Leverkusen